In Greek mythology, Lycus was the son of King Lycus of Thebes, the brother of Nycteus. He appeared in Euripides's Heracles.

Genealogy

Mythology 
Originally from Euboea, Lycus seized power in Ancient Thebes (Boeotia) by killing King Creon who at the time was regent for the son of Eteocles, Laodamas. Lycus mistreated Creon's family, throwing them out of their house and depriving them food and clothing. However, Creon was the father-in-law of the hero Heracles, who returned unexpectedly to Thebes and slew Lycus. Laodamas succeeded him as king.

Notes

References

 Euripides, Heracles, translated by E. P. Coleridge in The Complete Greek Drama, edited by Whitney J. Oates and Eugene O'Neill, Jr. Volume 1. New York. Random House. 1938. Online version at the Perseus Digital Library.
Euripides, Euripidis Fabulae. vol. 2. Gilbert Murray. Oxford. Clarendon Press, Oxford. 1913. Greek text available at the Perseus Digital Library.
 Tripp, Edward, Crowell's Handbook of Classical Mythology, Thomas Y. Crowell Co; First edition (June 1970). .

Theban kings
Kings in Greek mythology
Theban characters in Greek mythology